Waikite Valley  is a rural community in Rotorua Lakes within the Waikato region of New Zealand's North Island.

Education

References

Rotorua Lakes District
Populated places in Waikato
Populated places on the Waikato River